Shiwei may refer to:

Shiwei people, a historic Mongolic people
Shiwei, Inner Mongolia, a township in Ergun City, Inner Mongolia

Given names
Che Shiwei (born 1996), Chinese footballer
Chen Shiwei, Chinese track and field athlete
Pan Shiwei (born 1955), politician in Taiwan
Wang Shiwei (1906-1947), Chinese literary writer

See also
Shi Wei (disambiguation)